Kyzyl (Kızıl) is the capital city of the republic of Tuva, Russia. The name of the city means "red" or "crimson" in Tuvan (and in many other Turkic languages). Its population was

History

The city was founded in 1914 as Belotsarsk ("White Tsar's town"). In 1918, it was renamed Hem-Beldir. In 1926 it was given its present name. When the city was the capital of Tannu Tuva, it was named Kizil Khoto. In September 2014, Kyzyl celebrated its 100th anniversary as a city.

The settlement was founded in 1914 by Russian settlers immediately after the entry of the then Uryanhai Territory under the protectorate of the Russian Empire called  Belotsarsk .

In 1918, in connection with the revolution and the antimonarchist movement, it was renamed to Khem-Beldyr, and in 1926 to Kyzyl (Tuv .: red).

In 1921–1944, the city was the capital of Tuvan People's Republic, from 1944 to 1961 the capital of the RSFSR’s Tuva Autonomous Oblast, from 1961 to 1991 of the Tuva ASSR and since 1991 of the Republic of Tyva.

They began to lay a new city in the village of Vilany, in Tuvan – Khem-Beldyr, which means "confluence of rivers". Technological engineer K.V. Goguntsov and topographer M. Ya. Kryuchkov arrived here in February 1914. Kryuchkov drew a general plan of the city of Belotsarsk (fund 123, opis, 2, delo 21), which basically coincides with the plan of the central part of the city of Kyzyl. The city plan shows the numbers of the land plots and gives an explanation of who owns these plots. In May 1914, the head of the Russian population in Uryankhai approved the draft rules on the allotment of land plots and the organization of a committee for the improvement of the future city. The very first plots were allocated for houses of officials, administration, for honorary Uryankhs, treasury, post and telegraph office, state fire shed.

The city was built by recruited workers from Krasnoyarsk, Minusinsk, Tomsk and other cities of Siberia, Tuvan farm laborers, Russian workers who fled from gold mines because of difficult working and living conditions.

On July 4, 1915, the Commissioner for the Uryankhai Territory V. Yu. Grigoriev wrote a letter to the Head of the Russian population in the Uryankhai Territory, where the very important issue of creating a museum in the city of Belotsarsk was raised (fund 123, inventory 2, file 53, sheets 25–26).

At the IV Uryankhai regional congress on March 11, 1918, a decree was issued to rename Belottsarsk to Uryankhaisk. However, this name did not stick to the city, it was still called White Tsarsky.

The revolutionary events of 1917 in Russia did not pass by the new capital of Tuva. During a major battle (the White Tsarsky battle) between the red partisans of the detachment of P.E. Schetinkin and A.D. Kravchenko and the Kolchak men under the command of the captain G.K. Bologov at the end of August 1919, the city was almost completely burned down. The 10th congress of representatives of the Russian population of Tuva (September 16–20, 1920) gathered in the village of Turan, Uryankhai region. At this congress it was decided to restore the city and rename it the Red City.

On August 13, 1921, in the town of Sug-Bazhy (the village of Kochetovo), the Vsetuvinsky Constituent Khural of representatives of all khoshuns (khoshun was an administrative-territorial unit of that time) of Tuva gathered. Khural proclaimed the creation of an independent state – the Tuvan People's Republic. In March 1922, the Tuvan government, the Central Committee of the Tuvan People's Revolutionary Party (Central Committee of the TNRP), and the executive committee of the Russian Self-Governing Labor Colony (RSTK) were transferred to the restored Kyzyl. In the spring of 1922, the city of Kyzyl became the capital of the Tuva People's Republic (TNR).

In 1924, the Tuvan Central Cooperative (Tuvintsenkoop, TCC) was formed, which played a significant role in the development of industrial production, domestic and foreign trade. In 1925, the Tuvan National Bank (Tuvinbank) began its activity, which contributed to the development of all sectors of the national economy. In Kyzyl, enterprises for the processing of agricultural raw materials were organized, in 1928 a shoemaker's workshop was opened, in 1930-1931 – a sausage workshop, a pimokatny and tailoring workshop. In the early 1940s, a mill, a sawmill, a power station and a brick factory operated in Kyzyl, and sheepskin and fur production was organized. In 1929 the Kyzyl printing house was opened, the transport organization "Soyuztrans" was created. From that moment, the beginning of the development of the transport of the Tuvan People's Republic was laid. Two years later, the truck fleet consisted of 31 vehicles. In 1931, a telephone exchange for 30 subscribers was opened in the city of Kyzyl.

Geography

Kyzyl claims to be located exactly in the geographical center of Asia. Whether these coordinates are in fact the center of Asia is disputed (e.g., Ürümqi in China makes a similar claim). However, there is a monument labelled "Center of Asia" in English, Russian, and Tuvan which asserts this claim. Tos-Bulak is the area of open fields and mineral springs which lies immediately south of Kyzyl.

Kyzyl stands at the point where the Great Yenisey (Bii-Xem) meets the Little Yenisey (Kaa-Xem) river to form the Yenisey proper (Ulug-Xem). Most development takes place south of the Yenisey and Little Yenisey and follows the curves of the river, with the highest development centered just below the confluence of the Great Yenisey with the Little Yenisey. A monument was built in 1964 on the river bank to mark this..

Climate
Located far from any moderating bodies of water and at a relatively high latitude, temperatures can be extreme, though less so than the Sakha Republic. Nevertheless, the temperature has never risen above freezing from 22 November to 19 February, inclusive. On 20 February 2021 the temperature got above freezing in winter for the first time in recorded history. Temperature swings can be rapid.

Administrative and municipal status

Kyzyl is the capital of the republic. Within the framework of administrative divisions, it is incorporated as a city under republic jurisdiction (urban okrug, an administrative unit with the status equal to that of the districts), as Kyzyl Urban Okrug.

Demographics 
According to the 2020 All-Russian Population Census , as of October 1, 2021, in terms of population, the city was in 136th place out of 1117  cities of the Russian Federation  .

 National composition

According to the 2010 census, out of 109,918 residents of the city, Tuvans made up 68.09% (72,804 people), Russians - 28.42% (30,388 people), others - 3.49%  .

Industry
Manufacturing plants include brickyards, sawmills, furniture manufacturing, and food-processing plants.

Transportation

Road connection 
The federal highway M54 "Yenisei" connects Kyzyl with Abakan and Mongolia via Erzin.

Air traffic 

The city is served by the Kyzyl Airport. The airport provides regular flights to Moscow, Novosibirsk, Krasnoyarsk, Irkutsk, as well as to remote localities of the republic. The airport is included in the list of reference airports in Russia.

The railway 
There is a project of the Tuvan Railway with a railway terminal in Kyzyl. Kuragino–Kyzyl railway line is still being designed. The construction of the road started in 2011, but only  of track was built near Kyzyl.

Tourism

Sights

Sculpture complex Center of Asia

The obelisk, symbolizing the center of Asia, is located on the bank of the Yenisei River, in the city of Kyzyl of the Republic of Tuva. It was built three times — in 1964, 1984 and 2014. Today's monument is a whole sculptural ensemble.
The new obelisk was built according to the project of the Buryat artist Dashi Namdakov. It is represented by an ensemble of three lions holding a globe topped with a spire. Externally, the monument is very similar to the previous obelisk. It depicts grandiose figures of oriental dragons and a high stele, the decor of which is made in the form of symbolic animals intertwined in a rush of ascent to the sky. In addition, people see twelve cosmogonic animalistic images that make up the Buddhist horoscope.

Ethnic and cultural complex of Aldyn-Bulak
It occupies the coastal zone of the Yenisei, to Kyzyl-45 km. It is built as a kind of model of the universe, where the roles of stars and luminaries are assigned to yurts of different sizes and purposes. Although the yurts are decorated as authentic as possible, Aldyn-Bulak has all the amenities, including places to stay, a restaurant, a sauna, a parking lot.

Tsechenling Temple

One of the most important Buddhist attractions of Kyzyl. Built in 1998, it consists of two floors: the first – as a residence, the second – for prayings. The corners of the building look more worn out, this is due to the tradition of walking around the temple in a circle and touching the corners. Classes on spiritual practices and languages are held inside, admission is free.

Buddhist Prayer wheel
It was officially opened in 2006. It is considered the largest prayer wheel in Russia. It came from an Indian monastery, where the monks worked on the wheel for several years. Millions of scrolls with mantras are stacked inside.

Kadarchy Monument

It was installed in 1997 in front of the Kyzyl airport. The monument is a shepherd with a staff in traditional Tuvan clothing. After the sculpture took its place on the hill, the locals considered that the hero did not have enough liverstock, so "sheep" were placed nearby in the form of boulders painted white.

Mineral spring “Bobry”
The name is translated as "beavers": according to legend, people learned about the spring from these animals who came there to drink. There are more than 20 streams and springs, the water is collected in small natural and handmade bowls or spreads. According to legend, each of the streams treats different diseases, so tourists try the water from all of them.

National Museum of the Republic of Tyva

It was founded in 1929 in Kyzyl. Unique collections presented in the museum are: Archaeological collections of the Scythian mounds "Arzhaan" and "Arzhaan-2"; Tuvan ethnographic collections; Tuvan women's and men's silver jewelry; cult collections of Shamanism, Buddhism and Orthodoxy.

Dus-khol lake
A salty spring in the Republic of Tuva. In the Tuvan dialect, the name of the reservoir means “salt lake”. Dus-Khol is a natural monument and is under state protection. The water in this spring has healing properties. Throughout the summer season, tourists and locals come to the reservoir.

Events

International Festival of Live Music and Faith “Ustuu-Khuree”
The festival, which shows all the magnificence of indigenous cultures, has been held in the Republic of Tyva since 1999. The festival arose in line with the idea of restoring the ruins of a once majestic Buddhist temple in Chadan. The motto of the festival was live music and following the universal spiritual postulates of living faith (kindness, tolerance, unpretentiousness to the benefits of life).The simplicity of the living conditions of the tent city, the proximity to nature, the special atmosphere of the ruins of a Buddhist temple, the constant joint music playing of the participants — all these components created a unique image of the festival. Traditionally, the Ustuu-Khuree festival takes place in July.

International festival Khoomei in the Center of Asia"
The festival program traditionally includes competitions among throat singing performers, the consecration ceremony "Ovaa khoomei". It is held every two years. During the festival, the number of participants reached more than 600 people, including 31 foreign citizens from different countries, such as the US, China, Mongolia, Sweden, Germany, Japan, Brazil.

National holiday “Naadym”
Naadym is a Tuvan national holiday of shepherds, held annually in mid-August. It necessarily includes the national wrestling khuresh, horse racing, archery, competitions for the best national yurt, the best national costume and equipment of a horse.

Education 
School No. 1 (Kyzyl) – first school in the city.
Tyvan State University – is the only university in Tyva.

In popular culture

In the late 1980s, Kyzyl was visited by Ralph Leighton, who had made it a quest to reach Tuva with his friend, the Nobel Prize-winning physicist Richard Feynman. Though Feynman died before they reached Tuva, the journey is chronicled in the book Tuva or Bust!

The film Genghis Blues chronicles the pilgrimage of a blind blues performer, Paul Pena, who learned Tuvan throat singing by listening to his shortwave radio, to compete in the Tuvan throat singing competition.

Sister cities
 Honolulu, Hawaii, United States
 Rivne, Ukraine
 Cuiabá, Mato Grosso, Brazil (both cities are claimed to be located in the exact center of their respective continents)
 Erenhot, China
 Yakutsk, Russia

References

Notes

Sources

 
1914 establishments in the Russian Empire
Populated places established in 1914
Populated places on the Yenisei River